Oedaleus decorus is a species of band-winged grasshopper in the family Acrididae. It is found in the Palearctic.

References

External links

 

Oedipodinae
Palearctic insects
Insects described in 1825